German submarine U-778 was a Type VIIC U-boat built for Nazi Germany's Kriegsmarine in World War II. She only completed one combat patrol and sank no Allied ships. She was surrendered to the Allies at Bergen on 9 May 1945.

Design
German Type VIIC submarines were preceded by the shorter Type VIIB submarines. U-778 had a displacement of  when at the surface and  while submerged. She had two shafts and two  propellers.

U-778 was fitted with five  torpedo tubes (four fitted at the bow and one at the stern), fourteen torpedoes, one  SK C/35 naval gun, (220 rounds), one  Flak M42 and two twin  C/30 anti-aircraft guns. The boat had a complement of between forty-four and sixty.

Service history
The boat arrived at Horten in Norway on 28 February 1945 under the command of Oberleutnant zur See Ralf Jürs. She left Horten on her only war patrol on 4 March, completing the 23-day patrol on the 26 March 1945 at Bergen in Norway. No ships were sunk during the patrol and the U-boat was still at Bergen when she was surrendered to the Allies some six weeks later on 9 May 1945.

Proposed salvage
The wreck was rediscovered by marine archaeologist Innes McCartney in 2001. In 2007, Derry City Council announced plans to raise the boat to be the main exhibit of a new maritime museum. Many of the other Operation Deadlight U-boats were used for target practice and sunk by gunfire, torpedoes, rockets or bombs. U-778, by contrast, is remarkably intact and lies in relatively shallow water.

On 3 October 2007 an Irish diver died whilst filming the wreck as part of the salvage project. In November 2009, a spokesman from the council's heritage museum service announced the salvage project had been cancelled for cost reasons.

See also

 - salvaged in 1993.

References

Bibliography

External links

German Type VIIC submarines
Operation Deadlight
U-boats commissioned in 1944
U-boats sunk in 1945
World War II submarines of Germany
1944 ships
Ships built in Wilhelmshaven